The Pentaglot Dictionary (Chinese: 御製五體清文鑑, Yuzhi Wuti Qing Wenjian; the term 清文, Qingwen, "Qing language", was another name for the Manchu language in Chinese), also known as the Manchu Polyglot Dictionary, was a dictionary of major imperial languages compiled in the late Qianlong era of the Qing dynasty (also said to be compiled in 1794). The work contains Manchu lexemes and their translations into various administrative languages such as Tibetan, Mongolian, post-classical or vernacular Chagatai (Eastern Turki, now known as Modern Uyghur since 1921) and Chinese.

Title

The translations into the other languages are as follows:

 Tibetan:
rgyal pos mdzad pa’i skad lnga shan sbyar gyi manydzu’i skad gsal ba’i me long
 Mongolian:
qaɣan-u bičigsen tabun ǰüil-ün üsüg-iyer qabsuruɣsan manǰu ügen-ü toli bičig
 Chagatai:
ḫān-nïng fütügän beš qismi qošqan ḫat mānjū söz-ning ayrïmčïn ḫati

Structure

The Yuzhi Wuti Qing Wenjian is organized into six boxes, containing 36 volumes on 2563 pages.  The original work contained 32 volumes, with a four-volume supplement.  It is divided into divisions (such as "Heaven Division"), category (such as "Astronomy"), with the categories further separated into types.  There are 56 divisions, 318 categories, 616 types, with a total of 18,671 terms. Each term has eight rows.  From the top, the rows contain Manchu, Tibetan, a mechanical Tibetan transliteration into Manchu, a phonetic Tibetan transcription into Manchu, Mongolian, Chagatai, a transcription of Chagatai into Manchu, and Chinese.

For some terms, synonyms were included in the target languages (except Chinese). Thus, there are 19,503 terms used in Mongolian corresponding to 18,145 terms in Chinese (with 526 synonyms noted in Chinese).  The Manchu text was largely based on the Beijing dialect of Manchu, using vertical regular script, with sentences terminated with punctuation, but no subsidiary pronunciation marks. Tibetan used the common written Tibetan usage at the time, in horizontal script in Uchen script, with terms that could not be written into a single line divided at syllabic boundaries, and terminating punctuation marks. Under the Tibetan was the Manchu transliteration, using Manchu phonemes to transliterate Tibetan letters to allow two-way transliteration and using distinctive characters for initial and medial phonemes; further, to transliterate some Tibetan letters, some new written forms for Manchu phonemes were invented (including initial ng and terminal vowels).  Below the Manchu transliteration was the Manchu transcription to record the pronunciation in the Lhasa/Ü-Tsang dialect, due to the substantial difference between written Tibetan and spoken Tibetan. For Mongolian, the common written Mongolian of that time was used, in horizontal regular script, with punctuation marks at the end. Chagatai is written horizontally in Nastaʿlīq script, with terms that could not be written into a single line divided at syllabic boundaries and no terminal punctuations.  Below Chagatai was Manchu transcription to record the eastern Xinjiang Turkic pronunciation, due to the substantial difference between Chagatai and the spoken language of Xinjiang at the time; the sounds showed characteristics of the pronunciations used in the Hami/Turpan regions; Chinese was spelled in traditional Chinese characters, also in vertical regular script, with the diction showing the influence of common usage in the Beijing Mandarin dialect. No punctuation or pronunciation marks were used.

Below were the renderings of the first term, "Heaven," on the first page of the first section, "Astronomy":

Manuscripts and editions

The Yuzhi Wuti Qing Wenjian has been transmitted in three known manuscripts, held by the Beijing Palace Museum, the Yonghe Temple, and the British Museum in London. A print edition doesn’t seem to exist. In 1957, the Ethnic Publishing House (Nationalities Publishing House, Minzu Chubanshe, 民族出版社) published a photo-mechanic reproduction of the dictionary, which was reprinted in 1998. In 1967, Japanese scholars recompiled it and added Latin transliteration into a work known as the Interpretation of the Wuti Qing Wenjian. In 1967, an edition was published in Japan that added transliterations of Manchu, the Manchu transcriptions of the other languages and a Japanese translation. In 2013, a critical edition with complete transliterations as well as indices for all five languages was published in Germany.

 Tamura Jitsuzō 田村 實造, Imanishi Shunjū 今西 春秋, Satō Hisashi 佐藤 長 (Hg.): Gotai Shinbun kan yakukai 五體淸文鑑譯解. Kyōto, Kyōto daigaku bungakubu nairiku Ajia kenkyūjo 京都大學文學部內陸アジア硏究所 Shōwa 41–43 [1966–1968].
 :de:Oliver Corff, Kyoko Maezono, Wolfgang Lipp, Dorjpalam Dorj, Görööchin Gerelmaa, Aysima Mirsultan, Réka Stüber, Byambajav Töwshintögs, Xieyan Li (eds.): Auf kaiserlichen Befehl erstelltes Wörterbuch des Manjurischen in fünf Sprachen. „Fünfsprachenspiegel“. Systematisch angeordneter Wortschatz auf Manjurisch, Tibetisch, Mongolisch, Turki und Chinesisch. Wiesbaden, Harrassowitz 2013, .

The Yuzhi Wuti Qing Wenjian is based on the Yuzhi Siti Qing Wenjian 御製四體清文鑑 ("Imperially-Published Four-Script Textual Mirror of Qing"), with Chagatai added as fifth language. The four-language version of the dictionary with Tibetan was in turn based on an earlier three-language version with Manchu, Mongolian, and Chinese called the Yuzhi Manzhu Menggu Hanzi San He Jieyin Qingwen Jian 御製滿珠蒙古漢字三合切音清文鑑 ("Imperially-Published Manchu Mongol Chinese Three pronunciation explanation mirror of Qing"), which was in turn based on the Yuzhi Zengding Qing Wenjian 御製增訂清文鑑 ("Imperially-Published Revised and Enlarged mirror of Qing") in Manchu and Chinese, which used both Manchu script to transcribe Chinese words and Chinese characters to transcribe Manchu words with fanqie. In Mongol the title of 御製滿珠蒙古漢字三合切音清文鑑 is "(Qaɣan-u bicigsen) Manzu Mongɣol Kitad üsüg ɣurban züil-ün ajalɣu nejilegsen toli bicig". In Manchu the title of 御製增訂清文鑑 is "Han-i araha nonggime toktobuha Manju gisun-i buleku bithe". It was used in banner schools as a textbook. A tetraglot dictionary (Yuzhi Zengding Qing Wenjian) in manuscript form exists in the Harvard-Yenching Library, where black ink is used for Chinese and Manchu and red ink for Tibetan and Mongolian. In 1708 the Yuzhi Qing Wenjian 御制清文鉴 "han-i araha manju gisun buleku bithe" was published.

"gamma uc̆in nigen boti, orosil nigen boti".

See also
 Hua-Yi yiyu ("Sino-Barbarian Dictionary") - a series of bilingual Chinese-foreign language dictionaries in Jurchen, Korean, Japanese, Ryukyuan, Mongolian, Old Uyghur, Vietnamese, Cham, Dai, Thai, Burmese, Khmer, Persian, Tibetan, Malay, Javanese, Acehnese, and Sanskrit
 Yuding Xiyu Tongwen Zhi 欽定西域同文志 ("Imperial Western Regions Thesaurus")- a thesaurus of geographical names in Xinjiang in Oirat Mongol, Manchu, Chinese, Tibetan, and Chagatai.
 Mahāvyutpatti

References

External links 
 Internet Archive

 Google Books
 Yuzhi zengding Qingwen jian, Volumes 1-10
 Yuzhi zengding Qingwen jian, Volumes 11-21
 Yuzhi zengding Qingwen jian, Volumes 22-32

摛藻堂四庫全書薈要
 御製增訂清文鑑總綱《摛藻堂四庫全書薈要》本。本書8卷，拆分成8冊。 影印古籍 摛澡堂四庫全書薈要·經部·小學類
 御製增訂清文鑑《摛藻堂四庫全書薈要》本。本書32卷，拆分成30冊。 影印古籍 摛澡堂四庫全書薈要·經部·小學類
 御製增訂清文鑑《摛藻堂四庫全書薈要》本。本書32卷，拆分成30冊。 影印古籍 摛澡堂四庫全書薈要·經部·小學類
 御制增订清文鉴《摛藻堂四库全书荟要》本。本书32卷，拆分成30册。 影印古籍 摛澡堂四库全书荟要·经部·小学类
四庫之外
 御制增订清文鉴 （清）高宗弘历敕撰 本书32卷，拆分成30册。
 御製增訂清文鑑 （淸）高宗弘歷敕撰 本书32卷，拆分成30册。
Others
 御製五体清文鑑. 巻1-32,補編
 Wuti Qingwen jian 五體清文鑑.
 Some Notes on the Pentaglot Dictionary 
 Some Notes on the Pentaglot Dictionary: The Pentaglot Dictionary 
 Pentaglot Project
 A Preliminary HTML Dump of the Pentaglot Database
 Qingwenjian 清文鑑 "The Mirror to the National Languages"
 Pentaglot Dictionary

Lexicography
Multilingual dictionaries
Tibetan dictionaries
Chinese dictionaries
Mongolian dictionaries
Manchu literature